Slee may refer to:

People
 Carl Slee (born 1947), Welsh footballer
 Carry Slee (born 1949), Dutch author whose novel Afblijven is the basis for the films Keep Off and Timboektoe
 Colin Slee (1945–2010), clergyman in the Church of England
 George Slee (died 1613), wool merchant and clothier
 John Slee, mathematics master who taught John Gough
 Lanty Slee, (1800–1878), Lake District farmer
 Mike Slee, (born 1959), British film-maker, producer/director and writer
 Richard Slee (disambiguation)
 William Henry John Slee (1836–1907), known as W.H.J. Slee FGS, Chief Inspector of Mines for New South Wales

Locations
 Slee, County Fermanagh, a townland in County Fermanagh, Northern Ireland

SLEE may refer to:
 Service Logic Execution Environment in computing

See also
Van Slee